Valhalla RYS was a steam yacht, much admired in her day for her beauty and unusual rigging. She was famous for her participation in the Kaiser's Trans-Atlantic Race of 1905, and the sighting of a Sea-serpent in the Atlantic that same year. She had several owners, most notably Joe Laycock a trans-Atlantic racing yachtsman and Olympian, and Lord Crawford, who employed her as a research vessel on three major voyages from 1902 to 1908, which resulted in the book Three Voyages of a Naturalist : Being an Account of Many Little-Known Islands in Three Oceans Visited by the 'Valhalla' R.Y.S., by M.J. Nicoll, published in 1908. During the Great War she served with the Royal Navy as a part of the Eastern Mediterranean fleet's Aegean Squadron during the Gallipoli campaign. After the War she became a French-owned fruit carrier, before being wrecked off Cape St. Vincent in 1922.

Ownership by Joe Laycock

Her first owner was Capt. J. F. Laycock of Bawtry, Portsmouth, a British Army officer and Olympic sailor. Laycock, was a member of the  Royal Yacht Squadron at Cowes, he commissioned Ramage & Ferguson of Leith in 1892 to build him a Steel Auxiliary 3 masted steam yacht. Laycock had envisioned his own private clipper ship, a 3/4 sized version of the Cutty Sark. He drew up some basic outline plans, and handed them over to Mr. W. C. Storey, who produced detailed plans for both the yacht, and its auxiliary power unit. The design had its critics, however once built, she was found to have excellent sailing qualities. She is believed by many to have been the finest example of a steam auxiliary ever built.

Launched from the Victoria Shipyard on 20 October 1892. At 1,218 tons gross, she sailed for Southampton for fitting out. She was the only British steam yacht to carry a full ship rig and was originally rigged as a privateer with stun’s’ls. Her ward room, gun-room, and armoury after the manner of RN vessels of century before. Her complement was 96 hands.

Laycock had the yacht fitted with two Hotchkiss cannons and a Maxim machine gun. Most of the crew were ex Royal Navy and she had aboard a selection of rifles, pistols and cutlasses. For her maiden voyage of 9,632 miles; Laycock and ten idlers embarked from Southampton on 22 March 1893 for Madeira, around the Mediterranean (stopping off at Cannes for a family wedding), Constantinople, the Black Sea to Sevastopol and back to Cowes. Laycock later in 1894, had the firm of Howard Cox privately publish The Log of the Valhalla which covers this voyage in detail.

He took her to Newport, Rhode Island for the America's cup of 1895-1896, and gave Lord Dunraven a lift home via New York on 28 September 1895. The race was notable for Dunraven's allegations of cheating by the winning American yacht, Defender (1895 yacht). Dunraven had been racing the British keel cutter Valkyrie III.

In October 1896 the Prince of Monaco was negotiating with Laycock for the purchase of the yacht, which he had seen in New York for the America's cup. The Prince wanted her for deep sea and scientific experiments. A role she would later undertake for Crawford.

Laycock eventually sold her in October 1897.

1897 Portsmouth register closed.

Ownership by Count Boniface 'Boni' de Castellane

Paul Ernest Boniface de Castellane, was a French nobleman and politician. He was known as a leading Belle Époque tastemaker and the first husband of American railroad heiress Anna Gould.

In 1897, the couple acquired the Walhalla, a 230-foot, three-masted steam yacht, for the trifling sum of 200,000 dollars (6,6 million today): a “superb opportunity,” according to Boni. The ship had a crew of some 100 men under the orders of a Captain Vidamment.  and four officers. He and his wife went in 1897 to Norway with the Comte and Comtesse Jacques de Pourtales, the Marquis and Marquise de Chaponnay, and the Prince and Princess de Poix. In the Hardanger and Stavanger Fjords the Walhalla encountered the Hohenzollern, as Emperor William II, chanced to be cruising around Norway. The next cruise to the coast of Russia, where they crossed the Baltic to Petrograd, making eighteen knots an hour! They next made a trip through the Mediterranean taking Corsica and Malta in their itinerary.  At every port, Counts, Princesses, Grand Dukes and Duchesses were entertained on board.  It was on the Valhalla, at Cowes, that Boni gave a regal fête to King Edward, then Prince of Wales.  Four hundred tea roses brought from London adorned the portholes.

In August 1901 the yacht was sold to Lord Crawford.

Ownership by Lord Crawford

James Lindsay, 26th Earl of Crawford ( 1847–1913), registered her in London in 1902. Like Laycock, he too was a member of the Royal Yacht Squadron at Cowes. He was the owner of several private yachts that he used for scientific expeditions.

The Earl suffered from asthma, arthritis and rheumatism, he found that sailing in southern waters over the winter months was a means of seeking relief. He also had a keen interest in astronomy, and had sailed to Mauritius to observe the 1874 transit of Venus, the first of two in the 19th century, the second took place eight years later in 1882. During dinner in the Castle one night, Lord Crawford pointed to a star, observing that one day it may run into the earth. “If it does”, Sir Hercules Langrishe replied, “I hope we will be on the starboard tack”.

He also changed the old fashioned below deck arrangement. Valhalla in 1902-1908, she displaced 1700 tons, and was fitted with an auxiliary screw (1-Screw. T.3 cylinder 18 1/2, 27 1/4 & 47 – 33 inch) 145 nhp). She was capable under power of a speed of 10 ½ to 11 knots per hour; and under sail she could peak at 16 knots per hour. Equipped with roomy cabins with ample headroom. She had a freezing room capable of storing many tons of meat for long periods.

Crawford was to use her most notably for three world voyages, totaling 72,000 miles.

He first planned a world cruise for the winter of 1902. At the time he had an interest in the British Museum and a fellow trustee suggested that he make use of the voyage and collect items for the Natural History Department, and oceanographic research. Crawford employed an Ornithologist, Michael John Nicoll to assist with the project. They were to embark on three such voyages, and Nicoll would go on to chronicle them, in his book ‘’ Three voyages of a naturalist, being an account of many little- known islands in three oceans visited by the "Valhalla," R.Y.S.’’ published with a foreword by Crawford in 1908.

On to the east coast of South America, stopping at Bahia, Montevideo, via the Straits of Magellan to Valparaiso in Chile. She then struck west for 8,000 miles through the Southern Pacific islands, Easter Island, Pitcairn, Tahiti, Tutuila, Apia, Suva, Thursday Island, Singapore, Colombo, Aden, Suez, Port Said, Gibraltar, and back to Cowes by 1 August 1903. In 8 months she covered 38,000 miles.

In 1903 off Cape Guardafui a sudden whirlwind snapped off the jibboom.

Coincidentally in 1903 Crawford also owned the RYS registered Consuelo, "the most luxurious private steam yacht ever built".

The second Valhalla voyage was to the West Indies and the Gulf of Mexico. Leaving Cowes on 18 December 1903, starting at Barbados it took all the Island in, and up to Jamaica, the Caymans and Cuba, before arriving at Florida for tarpon fishing and coaling at Key West returning via Bermuda and the Azores to Cowes by 8 May 1904. They collected over 400 birds.

In 1905 she took a respectable ‘’easy third’’ place in the famous German Emperor’s Cup, despite being, by far, the largest participant. She crossed the Atlantic from Sandy Hook, to the Lizard under sail in only 14 days and 2 hours. All this despite competition afforded by much faster schooners taking part.

The third Crawford voyage was loosely inspired by the voyages of Captain Vanderdecken. Crawford and Nicoll would arrange another scientist, Edmund Meade-Waldo to join them on the expedition. Valhalla left Cowes on 8 November 1905. Calling in at Las Palmas, running off the Florida coast, St. Pauls's Rocks, Bahia and then on to the Southern Atlantic islands, and the  Southern Indian Ocean where two cyclones on the Madagascar coast, before arriving at the Seychelles. She returned home via the Suez Canal to Cowes by 13 May 1906. This was to be the most successful trip from a scientific standpoint, collecting many new species.

During this particular voyage on 7 December 1905 at around 10:15 am as the yacht, was cruising off the Florida coast a "large fin, or frill, sticking out of the water," was spotted several times. The frill was a good six feet in length and stood nearly two feet above the surface of the water. "A great neck rose out of the water in front of the frill," noted Meade-Waldo; its neck looked to be about the thickness of a man's body. The creature moved both its head and neck from side to side in a peculiar way. This great sea-serpent incident became famous and caused much interest back home in Britain. Three days later the Happy Warrior, a merchant sailing ship, reported a similar sighting, a "sea snake of great magnitude appeared off our port bow. Was several lengths of our ship. Had long neck. Sounded after few minutes. Estimated speed six knots." The Happy Warrior was only 80 miles from where the Valhalla had sighted its creature. A similar 200 foot long creature was also seen in 1906.

Following this last cruise, Nicholl was to be appointed in late 1906 as the second in charge of the Zoological Gardens in Giza, near Cairo, where he completed his book in January 1908.

She was last registered (in London) by Crawford in 1908. In 1911 she was re-Registered at Cowes.

World War I service

At the onset of WWI War in 1915 she was leased by the Royal Navy from her then current owner George Marvin. George Marvin & sons owned a successful yacht stores business in Cowes. She was renamed Valhalla II in February 1917, as her name had been allocated to HMS "Valhalla" (D44), a V class Flotilla Leader, launched in 1917.

She was to serve as a repair and depot ship, Pendant No 088. 1219grt/1490TM. Armament: 4-12pdr. In service 20 June 1916 – 9 September 1919, as a repair and depot ship 1917. Before her repair ship role, she may have served as wireless-equipped A/P Group Leader or in special yacht squadrons, at home or in Mediterranean. including a period at Limnos, in the Aegean, during the Gallipoli campaign.

The HMT ‘’Andrew Marvel’’ (H466) a hired Trawler from Hull, fitted with a 12-pound gun, used for mine sweeping duties, during her service between March 1915 and July 1918, was attached to her.

In 1919 the British naval register was closed.

Post war life

After the war, Valhalla was sold to a French company, ‘’Merrienne Frères - Alexandre & André - Soc. Merrienne’’ and converted into a fruit carrier. Her new owners registered her as a 1170 GRT steamer.

At some point her ownership was transferred to F. Baudoin, of Le Havre, France, and it was under her tenure that, while carrying oranges and wine from Valencia to Dunkirk, she foundered and was wrecked in a storm on 2 December 1921, off Cape St. Vincent.

References

Further reading
 Three voyages of a naturalist : being an account of many little- known islands in three oceans visited by the "Valhalla," R.Y.S. / by M. J. Nicoll ; with an introduction by the Earl of Crawford 
 Barker, Nicolas (1978) Bibliotheca Lindesiana: the Lives and Collections of Alexander William, 25th Earl of Crawford and 8th Earl of Balcarres, and James Ludovic, 26th Earl of Crawford and 9th Earl of Balcarres. London: for Presentation to the Roxburghe Club, and published by Bernard Quaritch
 Sailing Ships: The story of their Development from the Earliest Times to the ... By Edward Keble Chatterton

External links

1892 ships
Ships built in Leith
Steam yachts
Survey vessels of the Royal Navy